Abdul Rehman (born 14 April 1938) is a Pakistani boxer. He competed in the men's heavyweight event at the 1964 Summer Olympics. At the 1964 Summer Olympics, after receiving a bye in the Round of 16, he lost to Hans Huber of the United Team of Germany in a quarterfinal.

References

External links
 

1938 births
Living people
Pakistani male boxers
Olympic boxers of Pakistan
Boxers at the 1964 Summer Olympics
Place of birth missing (living people)
Asian Games medalists in boxing
Boxers at the 1966 Asian Games
Asian Games silver medalists for Pakistan
Medalists at the 1966 Asian Games
Heavyweight boxers
20th-century Pakistani people